is a Japanese manga series written and illustrated by Natsume Ono. It was serialized in Square Enix's Monthly Big Gangan magazine from June 2013 to October 2016, and has been compiled in six tankōbon volumes as of December 2016. An anime television series adaptation by Madhouse aired between January 10, 2017 and March 28, 2017.

Story

Setting 

The Kingdom of Dowa is subdivided into 13 states, each one granted their own autonomy. These 13 states have many agencies that are controlled by the giant civilian organization known as ACCA. Jean Otus is the second-in-command of the ACCA inspection agency. They keep track of all the activities of ACCA across the kingdom, and keep data on each state's ACCA office flowing toward the central office. One of Jean's jobs is taking business trips from the capital to the other districts to check on the situation and personnel there.

Media

Manga
Ono began serializing her manga series in the July 2013 issue of the Monthly Big Gangan magazine published by Square Enix on June 25, 2013, ending its serialization on October 25, 2016 in the eleventh 2016 issue of the magazine. As of December 24, 2016, the series has been published in six tankōbon volumes, with the first volume releasing on November 25, 2013, and the sixth and final volume releasing on December 24, 2016. Yen Press announced during their Sakura-Con 2017 panel that they have licensed the manga.

On December 24, 2016, Ono launched a spin-off manga titled ACCA 13-Ku Kansatsu-Ka P.S. that was serialized in the Monthly Big Gangan manga magazine from December 24, 2016 to October 25, 2017. Yen Press has also licensed the spin-off.

Anime
An anime television series adaptation of the manga was announced in May 2016. The anime was produced by Madhouse and directed by Shingo Natsume, with Tomohiro Suzuki handling series composition, Norifumi Kugai designing the characters and Ryō Takahashi composing the series' soundtrack. The series premiered on January 10, 2017 at 23:00 JST on Tokyo MX and later premiered on Sun TV, KBS Kyoto, TV Setouchi and BS11. It was released across three home video release volumes containing four episodes each, totaling twelve episodes. Crunchyroll has licensed the series in North America.

The opening theme is "Shadow and Truth" performed by ONE III NOTES, while the ending theme is  performed by Aira Yuhki.

, an original net animation animated by W-Toon Studio, began its release on the official anime's Twitter account in November 2016. It features an anime original super deformed mascot character named Acca-kun (アッカァくん), voiced by Ayumu Murase.

An original video animation titled  was announced on March 26, 2019 and premiered on February 14, 2020, with returning staff and cast.

Notes

References

External links
  
  
 

Manga series
2013 manga
2017 anime television series debuts
Anime series based on manga
Drama anime and manga
Funimation
Gangan Comics manga
Madhouse (company)
Manga adapted into television series
Seinen manga
Square Enix franchises
Yen Press titles
Tokyo MX original programming